Marcelle Meredith, born in Zambia and grew up in South Africa, is the Chief Executive Officer and Executive Director of the National Council of Societies for the Prevention of Cruelty to Animals (NSPCA). Meredith has been in the position since 1991.

Meredith is a former Board member of the World Animal Protection and has served on the organisations Board for more that 15 years representing Africa.

Awards 
In 2012, Meredith was the winner in the Eco-Angel award category of the Enviropaedia Eco-Logic Awards. In the same year Meredith received the Humane Society International Award for Extraordinary Commitment and Achievement recognizing an individual animal protectionist (particularly those from developing countries) whose hard work and compassion have led him or her to exceptional levels of bravery and self-sacrifice in striving to mitigate and prevent the suffering of animals from neglect, cruelty and exploitation.

In 2015, the World Animal Protection awarded Meredith with the Jeannette McDermott award for animal welfare. The award was created in Canada by the World Animal Protection in 1996 “in recognition of someone’s life devoted to animal welfare.” Dominique Bellemare, Chairman of WAP Canada stated: “Marcelle has done amazing work for the past decade and for the cause of animal welfare. She has used her years on the international platform to advance the cause of animal welfare in Africa. I thank her profusely for all her work and dedication.”

In 2016, Meredith received the Livestock Welfare Coordinating Committee (LWCC) award in recognition of her exceptional services to livestock welfare over decades.

References 

Living people
South African activists
South African women activists
Year of birth missing (living people)